Rio Othon Palace is a highrise hotel located on Copacabana Beach in Rio de Janeiro, Brazil. 

The 98-metre, 30-storey hotel opened in 1977 and has 585 guest rooms.

Gallery

Hotels in Rio de Janeiro (city)
Copacabana, Rio de Janeiro
Hotel buildings completed in 1977
Hotels established in 1977